Neil Brewer (born 15 July 1954) is a British musician, who is best known for being a member of the 1970s rock band Druid and for presenting the last four series of Rosie and Jim. Brewer played the role of a musical narrowboat owner, who while floating along the canals, would make up songs based on the experiences he had. He was nicknamed "Tootle" by the series' title characters. He sang a song at the end of each episode, accompanying himself on the concertina, and sometimes played the harmonica during episodes while seeking inspiration.

Following the deaths of Pat Hutchins in 2017, and original presenter John Cunliffe in 2018, he is the only surviving presenter of Rosie and Jim.

Neil also played bass guitar in The Never Never Band and Splash during the 1970s and 1980s after the demise of Druid.

References

External links 

Memories page for the Never Never Band

1954 births
Living people
British harmonica players
Concertina players

20th-century British guitarists
English guitarists
English rock bass guitarists
English rock guitarists